This is a list of scientific journals related to the field of fluid mechanics.

See also
List of scientific journals
List of physics journals
List of materials science journals

Fluid mechanics
 
Fluid mechanics